Khash District is one of the 28 districts of Badakhshan Province, Afghanistan.  It was created in 2005 from part of Jurm District and is home to approximately 43,306 residents, making it the third most populous district of the province.

References

External links
Map at the Afghanistan Information Management Services

Districts of Badakhshan Province